Ladera Golf Course is a municipal golf facility in owned by the city of Albuquerque, New Mexico. It is located on the West Mesa of Albuquerque and was opened in 1980.

Ladera includes an 18-hole golf course, a 9-hole executive course, a driving range, practice putting greens, and four lakes.

Measuring 7,107 yards from the longest tees, Ladera has the longest playing yardage of any municipal course in Albuquerque.

References

External links
Ladera Golf Course Official Site

Golf clubs and courses in New Mexico
Geography of Albuquerque, New Mexico
1980 establishments in New Mexico